Dodie McGuinness (born 1950) is an Irish Republican politician.

Born Anne Harkin, McGuinness worked at Altnagelvin Hospital before becoming involved in the Northern Ireland Civil Rights Association, then joining Sinn Féin in 1972.  She was present at the events of Bloody Sunday.

Harkin married the brother of Martin McGuinness, becoming known as Dodie McGuinness.  In 1985, she was elected to Derry City Council as a Sinn Féin member, holding the seat until 1993.

McGuinness stood as one of three Sinn Féin candidates in the European election in 1994, but was unsuccessful.  By that year, she was a member of the Sinn Féin Ard Chomhairle. In 1996, she was elected to the Northern Ireland Forum as one of four Sinn Féin members in Belfast West.

McGuinness did not stand for the Northern Ireland Assembly, and by 2003, she was the head of the Sinn Féin Bureau in England.  , she remains a member of the Ard Chomhairle, representing Derry. She is distantly related to the author Clive Cussler.

References

1950 births
Living people
Members of the Northern Ireland Forum
Women councillors in Northern Ireland
Sinn Féin politicians
21st-century politicians from Northern Ireland
20th-century politicians from Northern Ireland